Maaenboodhoo (Dhivehi: މާއެނބޫދޫ) is one of the inhabited islands of Dhaalu Atoll in the Maldives.

Geography

Demography

References

Islands of the Maldives